George Joseph was the Lord Mayor of the City of Adelaide in South Australia from 1977 to 1979.

Joseph is from a Lebanese Australian family who were involved in garment making. He grew up opposite the Cumberland Hotel in Waymouth Street in Adelaide's west end. One of his neighbours was future senator Nick Bolkus. He attended Christian Brothers School in Wakefield Street. Before becoming Lord Mayor, he worked as a lawyer in the same street he grew up on and was a city councillor.

References

Mayors and Lord Mayors of Adelaide
Australian people of Lebanese descent
Living people
Year of birth missing (living people)